The UAE League Cup, currently known as the Arabian Gulf Cup and previously known as the Emirates Cup followed a new simplified format for the 2013/14 season. The fourteen teams, sorted by draw into two groups of seven teams each, played each another only once during the group stages, with home or away fixtures also decided by draw. After the 7 rounds of the group stage, the top two teams of each group progressed to the Semi-finals of the competition, with the first-placed side gaining home advantage. The Semi-finals were won by Al Jazira (on penalties) and Al Ahli to set up the Arabian Gulf Cup final between the two sides,  on Saturday 19 April 2014. The Arabian Gulf Cup final was played at the neutral venue of the Hazza bin Zayed Stadium in Al Ain.

Group stage

Group A

Group B

Semi-finals

Final

References

External links
Emirates Cup tables and results at goalzz
Emirates Cup tables and results at Soccerway

UAE League Cup seasons
Etisalat Emirates Cup
2013–14 domestic association football cups